is a Japanese variety/documentary TV show produced by Fuji TV. It is hosted by Takeshi Kitano and began broadcasting in October 1997.

References

1990s Japanese television series
1997 Japanese television series debuts
Fuji TV original programming